Shane Elizabeth Gould  (born 23 November 1956) is an Australian former competition swimmer. She won three gold medals, a silver medal and a bronze, at the 1972 Summer Olympics. In 2018, she won the fifth season of Australian Survivor, becoming the oldest winner of any Survivor franchise.

Gould was born in Australia, but spent most of her childhood in Fiji after she and her family moved there. At age 15, Gould competed in the 1972 Summer Olympics in Munich, West Germany, winning three gold medals. Gould was named the Australian of the Year in 1972, and received an MBE in 1983. In April 2018, Gould was awarded an Order of Merit by the Australian Olympic Committee.

Gould returned in the 1990s as a swimming mentor and competitor. She competed in competitive swimming again in 2003, participating in the 200m Individual Medley. In 1999, she published her autobiography Tumble Turns. In 2018, she competed on Australian Survivor: Champions vs. Contenders and won, winning $500,000 as the Sole Survivor. Gould later returned for Australian Survivor: All Stars, but was voted out first.

Early life

Gould was born in Sydney, New South Wales, on the first day of competition of the 1956 Summer Olympics in Melbourne. She moved to Fiji with her family at the age of 18 months. By the age of six, she was a competent swimmer. She attended primary school at St. Peters Lutheran College, Brisbane, where a sporting house is named after her, and secondary school at Turramurra High School, Sydney, where a sporting house is also named after her and fellow Olympian Gail Neall.

She was trained by leading coaches Forbes and Ursula Carlile and their assistant Tom Green. She won all of her world swimming titles while a teenager, travelling widely.

Swimming career

At the 1972 Summer Olympics in Munich, West Germany, Gould won three gold medals, setting a world record in each race. She also won a bronze and a silver medal.

She is the only person, male or female, to hold every world freestyle record from 100 metres to 1500 metres and the 200-metre individual medley world record simultaneously, which she did from 12 December 1971 to 1 September 1972. She is the first female swimmer ever to win three Olympic gold medals in world record time, and the first swimmer, male or female, to win Olympic medals in five individual events in a single Olympics. She is also the only Australian to win three individual gold medals at a single Olympics.

At the age of 16, she retired from competitive swimming, citing pressures placed upon her by her success and media profile.

Over two decades later, Gould returned to competitive swimming at Masters level. She set Australian Masters records (40–44 years 100m, 200 m, and 400 m freestyle, and 100 m butterfly) and 45–49 years (50 m butterfly, 100 m and 200 m freestyle). In 2003, she broke the world record for the 45–49 years 200 m individual medley in 2:38.13 (beating the 1961 world record for all ages).

She coaches swimmers and still swims in Masters competitions.

Later career

Education 
Gould returned to study in the late 2000s. She studied at the Sydney Film School (2007, Cert IV documentary film, Digital Filmmaking) and was awarded a Master of Environmental Management (2010, with a thesis on the social uses and functions of public swimming pools), and a Master of Contemporary Art (2012, with a video piece Loops and Lines). Both degrees are from the University of Tasmania. In 2019 she was awarded a Doctor of Philosophy (PhD) degree from Victoria University.

Olympics 
In the 2000 Summer Olympics in Sydney, Gould carried the Olympic Torch at the stadium, as one of the runners for the final segment, before the lighting of the Olympic Flame.

Photography 
Gould is a photographer with works on display with the Art of the Olympians.

Biography 
In 1999, Gould published her autobiography Tumble Turns: An Autobiography.

Australian Survivor 
In August 2018, it was revealed that Gould would be participating in Australian Survivor: Champions vs. Contenders and would be a part of the Champions tribe. On 9 October 2018, Gould was crowned the winner of Australian Survivor: Champions vs. Contenders in a 5–4 vote against criminal barrister Sharn Coombes. With this win, Gould became the oldest person to ever win any international series of Survivor.

She later returned for Australian Survivor: All Stars, but was voted out first, finishing in 24th place.

Personal life 
Gould spent most of the years after ending competitive swimming out of the public eye. She married Neil Innes at 18, became a Christian, and lived on a working farm near Margaret River in Western Australia's South West. She farmed and taught horseriding and surfing, making very few public appearances. She has four children and three grandchildren.

Her marriage to Innes ended after 22 years, coinciding with a return to public life, and she married Milton Nelms in 2007. She now divides her time between Bicheno, Tasmania, and Sydney.

Publications
Gould, S. 1999, updated 2003. Tumble Turns. HarperCollins.  (autobiography)
Gould, S. 2004. Fit for 50+. Ibis Publishing Australia.
Gould, S. 2007. Appreciating swimming: beauty and instruction with underwater swimmer photographs.  Visual Communication 6: 170–179. doi:10.1177/1470357207077180

Honours and awards 

Best Sportswoman in the World (1971)
ABC Sportswoman of the Year (1971)
ABC Sportswoman of the Year (1972)
Australian of the Year (1972)
International Swimming Hall of Fame "Honor Swimmer" (1977)
Member of the Order of the British Empire (1981)
Sport Australia Hall of Fame (1985)
Olympic Order (1994)
Olympic Torch bearer (2000)
Australian Sports Medal (2000)
Centenary Medal (2001)
Sole Survivor (2018) Australian Survivor Champions Vs. Contenders 
Swimming Australia Hall of Fame (2022) - inaugural inductee. 

In 1993, the State Transit Authority named a RiverCat ferry after Gould.

See also
 List of members of the International Swimming Hall of Fame
 List of multiple Olympic medalists at a single Games
 List of Olympic medalists in swimming (women)
 World record progression 100 metres freestyle
 World record progression 200 metres freestyle
 World record progression 200 metres individual medley
 World record progression 400 metres freestyle
 World record progression 800 metres freestyle
 World record progression 1500 metres freestyle

References

External links 
 
 
 On Bicheno Beach Documentary produced by Australian Story

1956 births
Olympic swimmers of Australia
Swimmers at the 1972 Summer Olympics
Australian swimming coaches
Olympic gold medalists for Australia
Olympic silver medalists for Australia
Olympic bronze medalists for Australia
Australian of the Year Award winners
World record setters in swimming
Olympic bronze medalists in swimming
Australian female freestyle swimmers
Australian female medley swimmers
Recipients of the Australian Sports Medal
Members of the Order of Australia
Australian Members of the Order of the British Empire
Sport Australia Hall of Fame inductees
Sportswomen from New South Wales
Living people
Swimmers from Sydney
Medalists at the 1972 Summer Olympics
Olympic gold medalists in swimming
Olympic silver medalists in swimming
Australian Survivor contestants
Survivor (franchise) winners
Winners in the Survivor franchise
Australian republicans
20th-century Australian women